Kara is one of Togo's five regions. Kara is the regional capital.

Other major cities in the Kara region include Bafilo, Bassar, and Niamtougou.

Kara is divided into the prefectures of Assoli, Bassar, Bimah, Dankpen, Doufelgou, Kéran, and Kozah.

Kara is located north of Centrale Region and south of Savanes Region. To the west lies the Northern Region of Ghana, and to the east lie the Atakora (further north) and Donga (further south) Departments of Benin.

See also
Regions of Togo

References

 
Kara Region